Daniel George Stacey (31 August 1785 at St Aldate's, Oxford – 25 January 1863 at Hornchurch, Essex) was an English amateur cricketer who played first-class cricket from 1817 to 1820.

Mainly associated with Marylebone Cricket Club (MCC), he made 3 known appearances in first-class matches.  He played for the Gentlemen in the Gentlemen v Players series.

References

External links
 CricketArchive profile

Further reading
 Arthur Haygarth, Scores & Biographies, Volumes 1-11 (1744-1870), Lillywhite, 1862-72

1785 births
1863 deaths
English cricketers
English cricketers of 1787 to 1825
Marylebone Cricket Club cricketers
Gentlemen cricketers
Old Wykehamists cricketers